The 2019 Florida Atlantic Owls football team represented Florida Atlantic University in the 2019 NCAA Division I FBS football season. The Owls played their home games at FAU Stadium in Boca Raton, Florida, and competed in the East Division of Conference USA (CUSA). They were led by head coach Lane Kiffin, and interim head coach Glenn Spencer for their bowl game.

Preseason

CUSA media poll
Conference USA released their preseason media poll on July 16, 2019, with the Owls predicted to finish in third place in the East Division.

Schedule
Florida Atlantic announced its 2019 football schedule on January 10, 2019. The 2019 schedule consists of 6 home and away games in the regular season.

Schedule Source:

Game summaries

at Ohio State

UCF

at Ball State

Wagner

at Charlotte

Middle Tennessee

Marshall

at Old Dominion

at Western Kentucky

FIU

at UTSA

Southern Miss

UAB (C-USA Championship Game)

SMU (Boca Raton Bowl)

Rankings

Players drafted into the NFL

References

Florida Atlantic
Florida Atlantic Owls football seasons
Conference USA football champion seasons
Boca Raton Bowl champion seasons
Florida Atlantic Owls football